Yury Shcherbatsevich (born 11 July 1984) is a Belarusian rifle shooter. He competed at the 2012 Summer Olympics, where he placed 30th in the 50 m rifle prone event and 8th in the 50 m rifle three positions event.

References

External links

1984 births
Living people
Belarusian male sport shooters
Olympic shooters of Belarus
Shooters at the 2004 Summer Olympics
Shooters at the 2012 Summer Olympics
Shooters at the 2016 Summer Olympics
People from Chervyen
Shooters at the 2015 European Games
Universiade medalists in shooting
ISSF rifle shooters
Universiade gold medalists for Belarus
Shooters at the 2019 European Games
European Games silver medalists for Belarus
European Games medalists in shooting
Medalists at the 2011 Summer Universiade
Shooters at the 2020 Summer Olympics
Sportspeople from Minsk Region